Sarbananda Singh or Mejera was a Moamoria leader. He was Matak Chutia by ethnicity. He was the first ruler of the autonomous region called Matak rajya, selected by his followers, with its capital in Bengmara, in what is now Tinsukia district in the Indian state of Assam. He was the son of Merutnandan. He was succeeded by his eldest son Matibor Borsenapoti as the second ruler of the Matak Kingdom.

Notes

References

 

18th-century Indian royalty
Kingdoms of Assam
Tinsukia district